HPV-1 may refer to :
 HyperVision HPV-1, an ultra-high speed video camera developed by Shimadzu Corp.
 a human papillomavirus responsible for the common wart